The Province of Trieste was a province in the autonomous Friuli-Venezia Giulia region of Italy. Its capital was the city of Trieste.

There were 6 communes in the province.

History

Early history
After the dissolution of the Western Roman Empire, the area of the province of Trieste was ruled by the Ostrogoths, Eastern Romans (Byzantines), Lombards and by the Franks. With the advent of the Habsburgs (13th century) the territory was divided between the lords of Duino, Trieste, San Dorligo della Valle and Muggia. During the reign of Maria Theresa of Austria and, subsequently, Joseph II, the maritime trades were increased with institution of the free port.

In 1809, the area was ceded to France after the defeat of Austria in that year. After the French definitive defeat, the communes of Duino, Aurisina, Sgonico and Monrupino, which used to be part of Carniola, were annexed to that of Gorizia and Gradisca, while Trieste became a direct city of the Austrian Empire. San Dorligo della Valle and Muggia became part of Istria.

World War I left the territory of the province almost untouched, although fierce battles were fought just on its north-westernmost edges.

The whole area was occupied by Italy in November 1918, in the aftermath of Austria's defeat in World War I. It was officially annexed to Italy with the treaty of Rapallo of 1920, which also assigned all of the former Austrian Littoral to Italy.

Establishment 

The Province of Trieste was first established in 1920. It comprised the territory of the province at the time of its abolition, as well as significant portions of the Kras plateau and the region of Inner Carniola in present-day Slovenia. Between 1923 and 1943, the province of Trieste included also the communes of Monfalcone, Staranzano, Ronchi dei Legionari, San Canzian d'Isonzo, Turriaco, San Pier d'Isonzo, Fogliano-Redipuglia and Grado (today in Province of Gorizia), the current Slovenian municipalities of Sežana (including former communes of Dutovlje,  Tomaj and Lokev), Divača (including former communes of Senožeče and Vremski Britof), Postojna (shortly Postumia before 1945; including former communes of Bukovje, Hrenovice and Slavina) and Pivka (including former communes of Šmihel and Košana), as well as some settlements in the present-day Slovenian municipality of Koper, namely Hrvatini, Elerji, Spodnje Škofije, Plavje and Osp.

After World War II

After the end of World War II, the Free Territory of Trieste was established as a free state on 15 September 1947. On 26 October 1954, Italy and Yugoslavia came to an understanding whereby the territory de facto was divided between the two states. Zone A of the free state became the new Province of Trieste and Zone B was to be administered by Yugoslavia. The Province of Trieste formally became a part of Italy on 11 October 1977, by the Treaty of Osimo.

The province was abolished on 30 September 2017.

Languages 
Italian is spoken within the whole province. In the city of Trieste, many people speak Triestine, a dialect of Venetian. Tergestine, an archaic dialect of Friulian, was spoken in Trieste and in Muggia, but became completely extinct by the mid-19th century.

An estimated 8% of the province's population (25,000 out of 260,000 from the last 1971 census) belongs to the Slovene ethnic community.
Italian legislation recognizes and protects the Slovene linguistic minority in all six municipalities of the province, although visual bilingualism is not applied in the city centre of Trieste and in the town of Muggia. In addition to standard Slovene, which is taught in Slovene-language schools, three different Slovene dialects are spoken in the Province of Trieste. The Karst dialect is spoken in the municipalities of Duino-Aurisina and Sgonico, as well as in several settlements in the municipality of Trieste: Barcola, Prosecco, and Contovello. The Inner Carniolan dialect is spoken in the municipality of Monrupino and in several settlements of the municipality of Trieste, namely Opicina, Trebiciano, Padriciano, and Basovizza. The Istrian dialect is spoken in the municipalities of San Dorligo della Valle and in the rural areas of Muggia, as well as in the southern suburbs of Trieste (most notably in Servola).

Municipalities
The following is a list of the six municipalities (comuni) of the Province of Trieste, Italy. The capital of the province is in bold.

Points of interest
 Giardino Botanico Carsiana
 Val Rosandra
 Grotta Gigante
 Duino Castle
 Miramare Castle
 Rilke trail
 Sistiana Bay
 Timavo sources
 Fortified church in Monrupino

See also
List of governors of the Province of Trieste, for a list of governors of the province from 1918 to 1954
Venezia Giulia
Free Territory of Trieste
Villa Opicina

References

External links

 Provincia di Trieste - Official site

 
Trieste